Paul Hanley and Kevin Ullyett were the defending champions. They were both present but did not compete together.
Hanley partnered with Leander Paes, but lost in the first round to Martin Damm and Pavel Vízner.
Ullyett partnered with Eric Butorac, but lost in the first round to Alun Jones and Joseph Sirianni.

Richard Gasquet and Jo-Wilfried Tsonga won in the final 4–6, 6–4, [11–9], against Bob Bryan and Mike Bryan.

Seeds

Draw

Draw

External links
 Draw

Medibank International Men's Doubles
Men's Doubles